Dionis de Lys or Lis (born-16th century) was a Flemish conquistador in the service of the Spanish monarchy. He attended the first foundation of Buenos Aires by Pedro de Mendoza.

Biography 

Dionis was born in Lys, County of Flanders, the son of Johannes de Lys and Barboxa de Leys. He had arrived to the Río de la Plata in the expedition of Pedro de Mendoza, together with a contingents of Flemish adventurers.

Lys traveled to Asuncion, where he formed a family, a daughter Catalina de Lys was married to Luis Alegre, also born in Flanders.

References 

16th-century explorers
Flemish diaspora
Explorers of Argentina
Spanish colonial governors and administrators